= RMIT Health Innovations Research Institute =

The RMIT Health Innovations Research Institute (HIRi) was a major research institute of RMIT University.
